Maxim Turbulenc is a  musical group from Klánovice, Prague, Czech Republic. It was established in 1994 and originally consisted of Pavel Vohnout, Dan Vali, and Petr Panocha. In November 2005 Petr Panocha left the group and was replaced by Petr Novák. They mostly produce music for children and humorous songs and remixes of old hits.

Discography

Turbulence Dance (CD)  Monitor (2)  1995 
Ententýci (CD)  Monitor-EMI s.r.o.  1997 
Zpívánky S Maxim Turbulenc (CD)  Monitor-EMI s.r.o.  1997 
Nové Zpívánky (CD)  Monitor-EMI s.r.o.  1998 
Mejdan Století Jenom Pro Děti (CD)  Monitor-EMI s.r.o.  1999 
Veselé Zpívánky (CD)  Monitor-EMI s.r.o.  2000 
Maxíci Na Divokém Západě (CD)  Monitor-EMI s.r.o.  2001 
Veselé Zpívánky - Platinová Edice (2xCD)  Monitor-EMI s.r.o.  2001 
Jede Jede Mašinka (DVD-V)  EMI Czech Republic s.r.o.  2002 
Rozpustilé Zpívánky (CD)  EMI Czech Republic s.r.o.  2002 
Maxíci Na Indiánské Stezce (CD)  EMI Czech Republic s.r.o.  2003 
Sakum Prdum (2xCD)  EMI Czech Republic s.r.o.  2004 
Máme Rádi Zvířata (CD)  EMI Czech Republic s.r.o.  2005 
Suprový Zpívánky (CD, Album)  EMI Czech Republic s.r.o.  2006 
Maxim Turbulenc 2008 (CD, Album)  EMI Czech Republic s.r.o.  2007 
 Vánoční Zpívánky / To Nejlepší (2xCD)  EMI Czech Republic s.r.o.  2012

References

External links
Maxim Turbulenc website

Czech pop music groups
Musical groups established in 1994
1994 establishments in the Czech Republic